Anshan Teng'ao Airport , also called Anshan Air Base is a civil-military airport serving the city of Anshan in Liaoning Province, and a People's Liberation Army Air Force (PLAAF) installation in the Northern Theater Command Air Force. It is located in the town of Teng'ao, 11.8 km southwest of the city center. The airport maintains regular commercial flights to a handful of major Chinese cities, including Beijing, Shanghai, Nanjing, Chengdu, and Guangzhou. The airport also serves as the headquarters of the 1st Fighter Brigade which operates Chengdu J-20 stealth fighters. Commercial flights began in 1987, ceased in 2002, and resumed in April 2011 with a single route to Beijing.

History
During the Korean War, the Soviet Air Forces' 64th Fighter Aviation Corps was stationed at Anshan Air Base, where they actively engaged in the aerial defense of North Korea against the United States Air Force aircraft and attacking USAF aircraft in the area that became known as MiG Alley. The corps consisted of 351st Fighter Aviation Regiment, a night fighter regiment which consisted of MiG-15 and Lavochkin La-11. Due to the low effectiveness of the La-11 in air battles against jet aircraft, the regiment mastered the night fighting capability of the MiG-15, on which it continued combat operations.

Airlines and destinations

Trivia
Anshan Air Base was visited in March 2007 by Peter Pace, Chairman of the U.S. Joint Chiefs of Staff.
In Tom Clancy's novel The Bear and the Dragon, Anshan Air Base is heavily damaged by USAF F-117 stealth fighters to neutralize it in preparation for a raid on a nearby ICBM launch site.

See also
 List of airports in China
 List of the busiest airports in China
 List of Airbases in the PLAAF

References

External links
 Official web site
 Anshan Air Base at GlobalSecurity.org
 PLAAF Order of Battle at Scramble Magazine - Dutch Aviation Society

Airports in Liaoning
Chinese Air Force bases
Anshan
Korean War air bases